Lorraine Langford (November 1, 1923 – December 26, 1998) was an American homemaker and politician.

Born in Platte County, Nebraska, Langford went to University of Nebraska and University of Southern California. Langford was a homemaker and lived in Kearney, Nebraska. Langford served in the Nebraska State Legislature from 1987 to 1990 and was a Republican. Langford died in a hospital in Longwood, Florida.

Notes

1923 births
1998 deaths
People from Platte County, Nebraska
University of Nebraska alumni
University of Southern California alumni
Women state legislators in Nebraska
Republican Party Nebraska state senators
People from Kearney, Nebraska
20th-century American politicians
20th-century American women politicians